Freeman Lindsay was a member of the Wisconsin State Assembly.

Biography
Lindsay was born on February 19, 1837, in North Hudson, New York. During the American Civil War, he was an officer with the 118th New York Volunteer Infantry of the Union Army. Conflicts he took part in include the Battle of Drewry's Bluff, the Battle of Chaffin's Farm and the Siege of Petersburg. Afterwards, Lindsay settled in Neillsville, Wisconsin.

Political career
Lindsay was a member of the Assembly during the 1877 session. Previously, he had been Sheriff of Clark County, Wisconsin, from 1871 to 1873. He was a Republican.

References

People from Essex County, New York
People from Neillsville, Wisconsin
Republican Party members of the Wisconsin State Assembly
Wisconsin sheriffs
People of New York (state) in the American Civil War
Union Army officers
1837 births
Year of death missing
Military personnel from Wisconsin